For the sawmill area of Mangapehi see Ellis and Burnand#Mangapehi

The Mangapehi River is a river of the south Waikato region of New Zealand.

The New Zealand Ministry for Culture and Heritage gives a translation of "stream of trouble" for Mangapēhi.

See also
List of rivers of New Zealand

References

Waitomo District
Rivers of Waikato
Rivers of New Zealand